Yevhen Volodymyrovych Opanasenko (born 25 August 1990 in Zaporizhzhia, Ukrainian SSR) is a Ukrainian football defender who plays for Inhulets Petrove.

Career
Opanasenko is a product of the youth team systems at FC Krystal Kherson and FC Metalurh Zaporizhzhia. He made his debut for FC Metalurh entering as a second-half substitute against FC Dynamo Kyiv on 17 August 2008 in the Ukrainian Premier League.

He is also a member of the Ukraine national under-21 football team, called up by Pavlo Yakovenko, and made his debut as a second-half substitute in a match against the Netherlands national under-21 football team.

In July 2022 he signed for Kryvbas Kryvyi Rih.

References

External links
 
 

1990 births
Living people
Footballers from Zaporizhzhia
Ukrainian footballers
FC Metalurh Zaporizhzhia players
FC Metalurh-2 Zaporizhzhia players
FC Chornomorets Odesa players
FC Zorya Luhansk players
Ukrainian Premier League players
Ukrainian First League players
Ukrainian Second League players
Konyaspor footballers
Süper Lig players
Ukrainian expatriate footballers
Expatriate footballers in Turkey
Ukrainian expatriate sportspeople in Turkey
FC Vorskla Poltava players
FC Inhulets Petrove players
Association football midfielders